The Petty Harbour Hydro Electric Generating Station is a hydroelectric generating station in Petty Harbour–Maddox Cove, Newfoundland and Labrador. It was constructed in 1898 and it was the first hydroelectric generating station in Newfoundland. It was built by the St. John's Street Railway Company, a company established by Robert Reid. Operation commenced on 19 April 1900.

In 1920 Reid renamed the company the St. John's Light and Power Company. On 7 February 1921, an avalanche destroyed  of the wooden penstock that carried water from the dam to the generating station, cutting off all electrical power to St. John's for almost five days. Then, in 1924, the plant changed ownership to the Royal Securities Corporation of Montreal, where they began extensive reconstruction of the plant and watershed area. 

On 1 May 1978, the plant was entered in the Canadian Engineering Heritage Record as a model reflecting progressive adaptation to emerging technology, and remains today as one of the few plants of its type still in active service.

General Information 
Location: Petty Harbour-Maddox Cove, Newfoundland and LabradorOwner: Newfoundland PowerCapacity: 5.3 MWAverage Yearly Output: 18 gigawatt-hoursHead: 57.9 metresAverage Streamflow: 5.6 cmsOn-Line: 1900Original Design: G.H. Massey, A.C. RiceOriginal Construction: Reid Newfoundland Company

Equipment

Turbines 
Unit 1: (installed in 1902)
Inward-flow Girard type (impulse turbine)
1.4 MW
Manufactured by Stillwell, Bierce & Smith
Vaille Co.
Replaced in 1912 with
Horizontal Francis turbine
1.57 MW
Manufactured by Voith

Unit 2: (installed in 1900) Victor type (early Francis turbine)
1.4 MW
Manufactured by Stillwell, Bierce & Smith
Vaille Co.
Replaced in 1908 with
Horizontal Francis
1.57 MW
Manufactured by Voith

Unit 3: (installed in 1926)
Horizontal Francis
2.05 MW
Manufactured by Armstrong Whitworth

Generators 
Unit 2 (installed in 1900):
3-phase, 60 Hertz, 550 volts
Manufactured by Westinghouse
Replaced in 1926 with 
3-phase, 60 Hertz, 2,300 volts
Manufactured by General Electric
Unit 1 (installed in 1902):
3-phase, 60 Hertz, 550 volts
Manufactured by Westinghouse
Rewound in 1926 to 2,300 volts
Unit 3 (installed in 1926):
3-phase, 60 Hertz, 2,300 volts
Manufactured by General Electric

Construction

Powerhouse 

48.8 metres long by 7.3 metres wide
by 4.9 metres high
Masonry construction

Penstock 
Original:
1,057 metres long, 2.4-meter by 2.4-meter
cross-section wooden flume
112.2 metres long, 2.4-meter by 2.4-meter
cross-section rock tunnel
115.2 metres long, 2-meter-diameter
steel penstock
Replacements:
1926: 975-metre-long, 2.3-meter-diameter
wood stave penstock
1953: Steel penstock (surge tank riser)
replaced with 2.3-metre-diameter
steel pipe
1999: Lower 740.7 metres of penstock
replaced with 2.3-metre-diameter
steel pipe
2021: Remainder of penstock
replaced with 2.3-metre-diameter
steel pipe
Intake Structure:
Concrete with steel gate and lift
(integral to forebay dam)

Dams & Reservoirs

Forebay 
In 1900, rockfill with timber facing.
Replaced in 1926 with concrete gravity.
Steel anchors added in 1992.
9.1-meter maximum height.

Bay Bulls Big Pond 
Zoned earthfill (rebuilt 1998–1999)
Concrete outlet conduit

Cochrane Pond 

Earthfill with concrete overflow spillway and timber crib outlet.

Tailrace 
Unlined canal excavated in rock
137 metres long

References

Hydroelectric power stations in Newfoundland and Labrador